
Gmina Radziejowice is a rural gmina (administrative district) in Żyrardów County, Masovian Voivodeship, in east-central Poland.

Villages
Gmina Radziejowice contains the villages and settlements of Adamów, Adamów-Parcel, Benenard, Budy Józefowskie, Budy Mszczonowskie, Chroboty, Kamionka, Korytów, Korytów A, Krze Duże, Krzyżówka, Kuklówka Radziejowicka, Kuklówka Zarzeczna, Kuranów, Nowe Budy, Pieńki-Towarzystwo, Podlasie, Radziejowice, Radziejowice-Parcel, Słabomierz, Stare Budy Radziejowskie, Tartak Brzózki, Zazdrość and Zboiska.

Neighbouring gminas
Gmina Radziejowice is bordered by the town of Żyrardów and by the gminas of Grodzisk Mazowiecki, Jaktorów, Mszczonów, Puszcza Mariańska, Wiskitki and Żabia Wola.

References
Polish official population figures 2006

Radziejowice
Żyrardów County